John Hall Cottrell Jr. (November 15, 1917 – December 14, 2000) was an American politician. He was a member of the Arkansas House of Representatives, serving from 1955 to 1966. He was a member of the Democratic party.

References

2000 deaths
Speakers of the Arkansas House of Representatives
Democratic Party members of the Arkansas House of Representatives
1917 births
20th-century American politicians
People from Van Buren County, Arkansas